Hello Fascination is the second studio album by electronic rock duo Breathe Carolina. It was released on August 18, 2009 through Fearless Records. It was produced by Mike Green and Matt Squire.

Release
The album was released on August 18, 2009. It peaked at number 43 on the Billboard 200 and spent approximately two weeks on the chart. It also peaked in the Rock, Alternative, Independent, and Dance/Electronic Album Charts. A deluxe edition was released exclusively via iTunes on July 6, 2010, including five bonus tracks, three remixes, and a music video. "Hello Fascination" and "The Dressing Room" are available as downloadable content for the iPhone application Tap Tap Revenge.

Singles
"Hello Fascination" premiered via the duos MySpace page on July 24, 2009 before it was released for digital download on August 2, 2009 as the first single from the album. A trailer for the accompanying music video was released on January 27. The video was directed by Spence Nicholson and premiered on the duo's official MySpace page on February 3, 2010 whilst premiering on Fearless's YouTube channel on February 8. The song earned an MTV nomination for Best Freshman Video. The album's second single, "I.D.G.A.F.", was available for free download on the duo's Twitter page on June 8, 2010. An accompanying music video was shot in Los Angeles, California and was released on July 28. A clean version of the track was released on the deluxe edition of the album. The duo released "Welcome to Savannah" as a promotional single on June 30, 2009.

A limited vinyl edition of the album was released on February 3, 2010.

Reception

Tim Sendra of AllMusic gave the album 3 and a half stars out of 5, positively saying, "Hello Fascination won't top any year-end critics polls, but while it is playing, the goofy lyrics, bubblegum snappy melodies, and overall feeling of joyousness will make you feel good. What could be better than that?" However, Drew Beringer of AbsolutePunk gave the album a highly negative review, saying that "Breathe Carolina will sell a lot of copies, so good for them, but that doesn’t make this band any less despicable to self-respecting fans of music".

The album debuted at No. 43 on the Billboard 200 and sold 11,000 copies in its first week. The album sold over 60,000 copies in the US to date.

Track listing

Personnel
Credits for Hello Fascination adapted from AllMusic.

Breathe Carolina
Kyle Even – screamed vocals, clean vocals, synthesizers, keyboards, programming, guitar, bass
David Schmitt – clean vocals, synthesizers, keyboards, programming, guitar, drums, percussions
Additional musicians
Eric Armenta – drums, percussion

Production
Matt Squire – production, engineering, mixing
Mike Green – production, engineering, mixing
Alan Douches – mastering
Jason Paul Roberts – photography

Charts

References

2009 albums
Breathe Carolina albums
Fearless Records albums
Albums produced by Matt Squire